{{Automatic taxobox
|taxon = Neritiliidae
|image = Naturalis Biodiversity Center - RMNH.MOL.150611 - Neritilia rubida (Pease, 1865) - Neritiliidae - Mollusc shell.jpeg
|image_caption = Neritilia rubida shells
| authority =  Schepman, 1908
|synonyms_ref =
|synonyms = 
|type_genus = 
|subdivision_ranks = Genera
|subdivision = See text
|display_parents= 3
}}

Neritiliidae is a family of submarine cave snails, marine gastropod mollusks or micromollusks in the clade Cycloneritimorpha (according to the taxonomy of the Gastropoda by Bouchet & Rocroi, 2005).

Original spelling was Neritilidae. This family has no subfamilies according to the taxonomy of the Gastropoda by Bouchet & Rocroi, 2005.

Five species are freshwater.

 Genera 
Genera within the family Neritiliidae include:
 Bourdieria Lozouet, 2004 †
 Laddia Kano & Kase, 2008
 Micronerita Kano & Kase, 2008
 Neritilia Martens, 1875 - type genus of the family Neritiliidae, synonyms: Calceolata Iredale, 1918; Calceolina A. Adams, 1863
 Pisulina G. Nevill & H. Nevill, 1869
 Pisulinella Kano & Kase, 2000 †
 Platynerita Kano & Kase, 2003
 Septariellina 
 Siaesella Kano & Kase, 2008
 Teinostomops'' Kano & Kase, 2008

References

External links